Alejandro Díaz (24 November 1924 – 21 October 2002) was a Cuban gymnast. He competed in eight events at the 1948 Summer Olympics.

References

1924 births
2002 deaths
Cuban male artistic gymnasts
Olympic gymnasts of Cuba
Gymnasts at the 1948 Summer Olympics
Sportspeople from Havana
Cuban emigrants to Puerto Rico
20th-century Cuban people